Frayssinet-le-Gélat is a commune in the Lot department in south-western France.

History
In Frayssinet-le-Gélat, members of the French underground shot and killed a German officer. For this crime, 15 hostages were taken and assassinated by the SS. Ten were young males from one-child families and five were young women. This was to prevent any further family line of descent. The schoolmaster tried to escape but was shot outside the school. Each May 21, villagers gather outside the church for an act of remembrance. Outside the church is a small monument mounted with a stone cross, and a plaque bearing the names of the victims. Another monument to the 15th victim stands where he was shot.

See also
Communes of the Lot department
Official website of the commune of Frayssinet-le-Gélat

References 

Frayssinetlegelat